Moondru Per Moondru Kadal is the soundtrack album for 2013 Indian Tamil-language romance film of the same name starring Arjun, Cheran, Vimal, Surveen Chawla, Muktha Bhanu and Lasini. The film’s cinematography and editing were handled by Bhojan K. Dinesh and S. N. Fazil respectively. The film features music composed by Yuvan Shankar Raja. Vasanth hired him as the composer, with whom he had previously worked in Poovellam Kettuppar (1999) and his last project Satham Podathey (2007).

Development
In an interview, the director stated that Yuvan Shankar Raja had put in about seven months of work for this film, while describing the genre of the soundtrack as post-modern music. The soundtrack album features six songs with lyrics penned by Na. Muthukumar.

Composing was started even before the film was launched, with the first song being recorded on 9 August 2011. Popular Bollywood singer Sonu Nigam originally sang the melody titled "Mazhai Mazhai Mazhaiyo Mazhai", which was recorded in Mumbai. The final version, however, featured Karthik's vocals. Neha Bhasin, who had sung the well received song "Pesugiren" in Satham Podathey before, lent her voice for another song in the album. Nandini Srikar of Ra.One fame crooned a solo "Aaha Kadhal", which, too, was recorded in Mumbai, while composer Ramesh Vinayagam sang a peppy number titled "Stop the Paatu" for the album. A teaser trailer of "Stop The Paatu" was released online in September 2012 and garnered positive response. The composer himself performed the song "Unakkagave" which was dubbed as the first dubstep track in Tamil cinema. Yuvan Shankar Raja later revealed that he had not composed a single new tune for the film, but that all were stock songs he had earlier recorded which were chosen by Vasanth. The final mixing was done by Kausikan Sivalingam in Berlin, according to Vasanth.

Release
The album was launched in a critically acclaimed event on 25 January 2013 at the Park Sheraton Hotel in Chennai. The entire cast and crew of the film, besides noted film personalities, including directors K. Balachander, K. S. Ravikumar, K. Bhagyaraj, N. Lingusamy, Sasi and actors Shanthanu Bhagyaraj, Khushbu, Krishna, Prakash Raj were present at the function which was host by television anchors Ma Ka Pa Anand and Divyadarshini. The songs from the album were also performed live on stage by the original artists.

Track listing

Reception
The album received very positive critical response. Milliblog wrote: "Vasanth and Yuvan’s combination continues to rock!. Indiaglitz wrote: "A good collection of songs at the end of the year, almost appears as if it has been picked out of good songs". Behindwoods wrote: "Overall, the album might have been described as ‘post-modern’ by the director,[sic] Yuvan Shankar Raja does things his own way, and does it mighty good". S. Saraswathi from Rediff wrote "Music by Yuvan Shankar Raja is the only saving grace of an otherwise ordinary film. Every song has its own unique flavour and is incredible" and described the music as "exceptional". Sify stated "Yuvan Shankar Raja`s music and background score is terrific with right mixture of melodies and fast numbers with `Aaha Kathal` and `Mazhai Mazhai` being the pick of the lot".

References

External links 
 

Tamil film soundtracks
Yuvan Shankar Raja soundtracks
Romance film soundtracks